| tries = {{#expr:
 + 4 + 5 + 3 + 8 + 5 
 + 4 + 2 + 8 + 8 + 7
 + 7 + 4 + 10 + 8 + 7
 + 6 + 8 + 3 + 6 + 9
 + 5 + 8 + 5 + 6 + 7
 + 3 + 5 + 6 + 8 + 8
 + 9 + 5 + 5 + 10 + 3
 + 7 + 11 + 12 + 6 + 7
 + 4 + 3 + 3 + 8 + 3
 + 2 + 11 + 9 + 7 + 5
 + 3 + 6 + 6 + 8 + 7
 + 4 + 6 + 6 + 4 +10
 + 7 + 8 + 6 + 2 + 7
 + 5 + 3 + 9 + 5 + 5
 + 11 + 4 + 6 + 11 + 12
 + 6 + 9 + 8 + 6 + 9
 + 6 + 4 + 6 + 4 + 5
 + 10 + 8 + 4 + 2 + 6
 + 9 + 7 + 4 + 10 + 3
 + 3 + 11 + 8 + 7 + 8
 + 4 + 9 + 16 + 13 + 9
 + 12 + 4 + 7 + 11 + 7
 + 6 + 7

}}
| lowest attendance  = 438Ealing Trailfinders v Jersey Reds (17 September 2016)
| top point scorer   =  Tommy Bell (London Irish) 253
| top try scorer     =  Jonah Holmes(Yorkshire Carnegie) 16
| prevseason         = 2015–16
| nextseason         = 2017–18
}}

The 2016–17 RFU Championship, known for sponsorship reasons as the Greene King IPA Championship, is the eighth season of the professionalised format of the RFU Championship, the second tier of the English rugby union league system run by the Rugby Football Union. It is contested by eleven English clubs and one from Jersey in the Channel Islands. This will be the fourth year of the competition's sponsorship with Greene King Brewery. The twelve teams in the RFU Championship also compete in the British and Irish Cup, along with clubs from Ireland and Wales. Some matches in the RFU Championship are broadcast on Sky Sports.

On 24 January 2017 London Welsh were expelled from the championship after failing to meet the conditions required by the RFU to extend a temporary licence granted after their liquidation. The club's record for the season was expunged. The RFU announced that no team would be relegated from the Championship at the end of the season.

Structure
The Championship's structure has all the teams playing each other on a home and away basis. The play-off structure will remain the same as the previous year. The top four teams at the end of the home-and-away season qualify for the promotion play-offs which follow a 1 v 4, 2 v 3 system. The winners have to meet the RFU's Minimum Standards Criteria in order to be promoted to the English Premiership. There is no promotion if a ground fails to meet the criteria. Unlike previous seasons there will be no relegation from the league this year.

In 2015 the RFU increased annual funding to over £500,000 per club, an agreement which will last until 2020. Despite this, Cornish Pirates stated more money was needed in RFU grants to support a fully professional second tier.

The 2016–17 season was also the last for play-offs in the Championship for three seasons. Starting with the 2017–18 season, the play-offs will be replaced by automatic promotion for the team that finishes first in the home-and-away season, provided said team meets the Minimum Standards Criteria.

Teams
After ten seasons in the Championship Birmingham Moseley were relegated following their last place finish in 2016. They are replaced by Richmond, who won the National League 1 and return to the second tier for the first time since 1997. Richmond subsequently entered administration and dropped eight tiers following two seasons in the premiership between 1997 and 1999. As a result, Richmond stated that they would remain semi-professional and not sign any professional players despite the RFU Championship being fully professional. London Irish, an original founder of the professional English Premiership, join the league after relegation from the 2015–16 Aviva Premiership, finishing bottom of the table.

On 7 December 2016 London Welsh RFC went into liquidation.  They were deducted 20 points but allowed to continue in the Championship until January when the RFU would decide on their future. On 24 January 2017 London Welsh were expelled from the championship after failing to meet the conditions required by the RFU to extend the temporary licence. The club's record for the season was expunged and there would be no relegation from the Championship at the end of  season.

Notes

Table

Fixtures
Fixtures for the season were announced by the RFU on 8 July 2016.

Round 1

Round 2

Round 3

Round 4

Round 5

Round 6

Round 7

Round 8

Round 9

Round 10

Round 11

Round 12

Round 13

Round 14

Round 15

Round 16

Round 17

Round 18

Round 19

Round 20

Round 21

Round 22

Play-offs

Semi-finals
The semi-finals follow a 1 v 4, 2 v 3 system – with the games being played over two-legs and the higher placed team choosing which leg they play at home. The matches are due to be played on 28/30 April 2017 and 5/6 May 2017. London Irish and Yorkshire finished 1st and 2nd respectively and both chose to play the second leg at home. It was announced on 27 April that both London Irish and Yorkshire Carnegie were eligible for promotion while Doncaster Knights and Ealing Trailfinders did not apply for audit for minimum standards criteria and therefore will not be promoted should they win the championship.

First leg

Second leg

  Yorkshire Carnegie won 52 – 36 on aggregate

 London Irish won 74 – 25 on aggregate

Final
The final is played over two legs – with the higher placed team deciding which leg they play at home.

First leg

Second leg

 London Irish won 84 – 66 on aggregate and are promoted to the Premiership

Attendances
Includes playoff games.

Notes

Individual statistics
 Note that points scorers includes tries as well as conversions, penalties and drop goals. Appearance figures also include coming on as substitutes (unused substitutes not included).  Stats also cover playoff games.

Top points scorers

Top try scorers

Season records
 Updated to 17 May 2017

Team
Largest home win — 79 pts
82 – 3 London Irish at home to Rotherham Titans on 8 April 2017
Largest away win — 50 pts
62 – 12 London Irish away to London Scottish on 30 October 2016
Most points scored — 82 pts
82 – 3	London Irish at home to Rotherham Titans on 8 April 2017
Most tries in a match — 12
London Irish at home to Rotherham Titans on 8 April 2017
Most conversions in a match — 11
London Irish at home to Rotherham Titans on 8 April 2017
Most penalties in a match — 7
London Scottish at home to Ealing Trailfinders on 2 December 2016
Most drop goals in a match — 1
N/A - multiple teams

Player
Most points in a match — 32
 Tommy Bell for London Irish away to London Scottish on 30 October 2016
Most tries in a match — 3 (x9)
 Tyson Lewis for Doncaster Knights away to Richmond on 17 September 2016
 Patrick Tapley for Bedford Blues at home to Richmond on 1 October 2016
 Jason Harries for London Scottish away to Doncaster Knights on 5 November 2016
 TJ Harris for Nottingham at home to Yorkshire Carnegie on 26 December 2016
 Ben West for Yorkshire Carnegie at home to Richmond on 26 March 2017
 Ryan Burrows for Yorkshire Carnegie away to Bedford Blues on 8 April 2017
 Alex Lewington for London Irish at home to Rotherham Titans on 8 April 2017
 Tom Duncan for Cornish Pirates at home to Bedford Blues on 15 April 2017
 James Stephenson for Nottingham away to London Scottish on 15 April 2017
Most conversions in a match — 8 (x2)
 Tommy Bell for London Irish away to London Scottish on 30 October 2016
 Joe Ford for Yorkshire Carnegie at home to Rotherham Titans on 5 February 2017
Most penalties in a match — 7
 Peter Lydon for London Scottish at home to Ealing Trailfinders on 2 December 2016
Most drop goals in a match — 1
N/A - multiple players

Attendances
Highest — 11,671
London Irish at home to Cornish Pirates on 18 March 2017
Lowest — 438 
Ealing Trailfinders at home to Jersey Reds on 17 September 2016
Highest Average Attendance — 4,110
London Irish
Lowest Average Attendance — 914
Ealing Trailfinders

See also
 2016–17 British and Irish Cup
 List of English Rugby Union stadiums by capacity

References

External links
 RFU Championship news

 
2016–17 in English rugby union leagues
2016-17